This is a summary of 1987 in music in the United Kingdom, including the official charts from that year.

Summary
The start of the year saw an important milestone in electronic dance music, when Steve "Silk" Hurley's song "Jack Your Body" became the first house music track to reach number 1 in the UK charts. This was despite Hurley refusing to promote the song, and the 12-inch single technically breaking chart rules as it was longer than the allowed 25-minute play time. House music had been steadily growing in popularity since it started underground in the early 1980s, and another number 1 would follow in September, the huge selling "Pump Up The Volume" by British act M|A|R|R|S which was one of the top ten biggest selling songs of the year.

For most of the 1980s, the main musical format in the charts was the gramophone record, with songs being released on both 7-inch and 12-inch vinyl singles. However, in 1987 two new formats started to appear. The first was the digital CD single, where songs are put on a Compact Disc. These were first made eligible for the UK Singles Chart this year, and the first number 1 to be released as a CD single was Whitney Houston's "I Wanna Dance with Somebody (Who Loves Me)" released in May. The second was the cassette single where the song is released on an audio tape - the BPI began recording their sales this year, but they would not become eligible until 1989. Both formats would dominate the chart throughout the 1990s.

Synthpop bands Pet Shop Boys and Erasure continued their success from their breakthrough year in 1986, with the Pet Shop Boys achieving their second number 1 single ("It's a Sin") in the summer, and two more top ten singles with "What Have I Done to Deserve This?", a collaboration with Dusty Springfield, which peaked at number 2, and "Rent", which peaked at number 8. Their album "Actually" also sold well and peaked at number 2. Erasure's album The Circus was their first charting album and peaked at number 6, and had two top 10 hits this year with the eponymous title track and "Victim of Love", as well as the number 12 charting "It Doesn't Have to Be" and their big hit from the previous year, "Sometimes". Both bands would continue to have huge success into the early 1990s.

The sound of producers Stock Aitken Waterman continued to grow in popularity, as they moved from their previous Hi-NRG sound to one more pop-based. It gave them big hits with girl group Bananarama, with their song "Love in the First Degree" becoming their biggest hit ever when it peaked at number 3, and American singer Sinitta with "Toy Boy", the successful No.4 followup to the big selling song "So Macho" from 1986. They also achieved two number one's, one being girl duo Mel and Kim's "Respectable", and created a huge star with the baritone-voiced singer Rick Astley. In 1987 he had a number one album with "Whenever You Need Somebody", and several high charting singles including the title track and the biggest selling single of the year, his number 1 breakthrough song "Never Gonna Give You Up".

Madonna continued her long run of Top Ten hits throughout the year, scoring two number one's, "La Isla Bonita" in April and "Who's That Girl" in July; the former was her third number one single from the multi-million selling album True Blue and the latter was taken from the film of the same name in which Madonna herself starred. Although the film was critically panned, the soundtrack album hit a respectable No.4 and generated two more Top 10 hits for Madonna; "Causing a Commotion" (No.4, September) and "The Look of Love" (No.9, December).

Soul singer Ben E. King got a surprise number 1 with a re-release of 1961's "Stand by Me", which was used in an advert for Levi Jeans.  Long running band The Bee Gees also got their first number 1 of the decade with "You Win Again", their fifth overall in a 20-year career, and Michael Jackson released the multi-million selling "Bad" one of the highest selling albums in UK chart history. It spawned the number 1 single "I Just Can't Stop Loving You" (a duet with Siedah Garrett), the number 3 title track and the number 3 "The Way You Make Me Feel". The year also saw George Michael launch his solo career post-Wham! with the album "Faith" and its title track, which reached number 2.

The race for the Christmas number one single had many contenders this year. Rick Astley released a cover of "When I Fall In Love", and the 1956 Nat King Cole version was re-released at the same time, while 'Mel & Kim' released a cover of "Rocking Around The Christmas Tree" - however, this referred to comedian Mel Smith and singer Kim Wilde rather than the girl group of the same name; proceeds went to the charity Comic Relief. A very popular Christmas song released this year was a collaboration with Irish band The Pogues and singer Kirsty MacColl, with the song "Fairytale of New York". With its bitter tale about the breakup of two lovers, it was very different from other Christmas songs around.

In the end, it was the Pet Shop Boys who had the Christmas number one of 1987, with their cover of Elvis Presley's "Always on My Mind". The Pogues peaked at number 2 and has been re-issued several times since, reaching the top 10 in 2005, 2006 and 2007.

In the world of classical music, Nicholas Maw's new work Odyssey made an impact, and veteran composer Malcolm Arnold produced his Salute to Thomas Merritt, Op. 98, whilst Michael Nyman and Judith Weir both brought new operas to the stage.  The BBC Cardiff Singer of the World competition was won by Italian soprano Valeria Esposito, and the Lieder prize was introduced into the competition for the first time.

Events
5 January – Elton John undergoes throat surgery in Australia, ultimately resulting in his voice becoming permanently deeper.
9 March - The career that would end in an infamous appearance at The Brit awards and the burning of a million pounds began with The Justified Ancients of Mu Mu releasing their debut single, "All You Need Is Love".
24 April - The Tube is axed after 5 series and  4 and a half years
9 May – Ireland's Johnny Logan wins the Eurovision Song Contest, held in Brussels, Belgium, with the song "Hold Me Now", making him the first artist to win the contest twice.  The UK's entry, "Only the Light" by Rikki, finishes in 13th place.
June - Johnny Marr leaves The Smiths, and shortly after, the band splits up, just prior to the release of their final album 'Strangeways, Here We Come'.
1 June - George Michael's single "I Want Your Sex" is banned by the BBC, except for post-watershed hours, and the video is also banned.
1 August - Dave Stewart of Eurythmics and Siobhan Fahey of Bananarama are married in Normandy, France.
December - The Old Grey Whistle Test is axed and its last episode is shown on 1 January 1988.

Charts

Number one singles

Number one albums

Year-end charts

Best-selling singles

Best-selling albums

Notes:

Classical music
Richard Rodney Bennett - Symphony No. 3
Robin Holloway - Brass Quintet: Divertimento No. 5, Op. 67
Nicholas Maw - Odyssey (1973–87)

Opera
Peter Maxwell Davies - Resurrection
Nigel Osborne - The Electrification of the Soviet Union
Judith Weir - A Night at the Chinese Opera.

Musical films
Aria
The Hunting of the Snark

Births
9 January – Paolo Nutini, singer, songwriter
5 February – Richard Rawson, rapper and songwriter
9 February – Sam Coulson, guitarist (Asia)
11 March – Timothy Furse, musician, (The Horrors)
11 April – Joss Stone, singer
4 June – Mollie King, singer, (The Saturdays)
6 June – Kyle Falconer, musician, (The View)
28 June – Bailey Tzuke, singer-songwriter
6 July – Kate Nash, singer, songwriter
19 July – Nicola Benedetti, violinist
30 November – Dougie Poynter, musician, (McFly)

Deaths
3 January - Alex Campbell, folk singer, 61
10 January – Marion Hutton, singer and actress, 67
13 March - Gerald Moore, pianist, 87
18 March - Elizabeth Poston, composer, 81
24 May – Hermione Gingold, actress and singer, 89
24 August - Douglas Byng, comic singer and songwriter, 94
19 October – Jacqueline du Pré, cellist, 42 (multiple sclerosis)
3 December - Marjorie Eyre, operatic soprano, 90
24 December - Manoug Parikian, violinist, 67

Music awards

BRIT Awards
The 1987 BRIT Awards winners were:

Best British producer: Dave Stewart
Best classical recording: Julian Lloyd Webber/Royal Philharmonic Orchestra "Elgar Cello Concerto"
Best international solo artist – Paul Simon
Best soundtrack: Top Gun
British album: Dire Straits Brothers in Arms
British breakthrough act: The Housemartins
British female solo artist: Kate Bush
British group: Five Star
British male solo artist: Peter Gabriel
British single: Pet Shop Boys - "West End Girls"
British Video: Peter Gabriel - "Sledgehammer"
International group: The Bangles
Outstanding contribution: Eric Clapton

Ivor Novello Awards
Best International Hit: Pet Shop Boys, "West End Girls"
Outstanding Contribution to British Music - Queen
Outstanding Services to British music - Yehudi Menuhin
Songwriter of the Year Stock Aitken Waterman

See also
 1987 in British radio
 1987 in British television
 1987 in the United Kingdom
 List of British films of 1987

References

External links
 BBC Radio 1's Chart Show
 The Official Charts Company

 
British music
British music by year